Today and Now is an album by American jazz saxophonist Coleman Hawkins featuring performances recorded in 1962 for the Impulse! label.

Reception
The Allmusic review by  Steven McDonald awarded the album 4 stars stating "Not always the most compelling title from the Hawkins catalog, the record at least has the virtue of both being listenable and worthy of somewhat deeper inspection".

Track listing
 "Go Li'l Liza" (Traditional) – 6:25
 "Quintessence" (Quincy Jones) – 4:46
 "Don't Love Me" (Bill Katz, Pauline Rivelli, Ruth Roberts) – 4:40
 "Love Song from "Apache"" (Johnny Mercer, David Raksin) – 4:14
 "Put on Your Old Grey Bonnett" (Stanley Murphy, Percy Wenrich) – 9:51
 "Swingin' Scotch" (Coleman Hawkins) – 5:32
 "Don't Sit Under the Apple Tree (With Anyone Else but Me)" (Sam H. Stept, Lew Brown, Charles Tobias) – 4:33

Recorded on September 9, 1962 (1-4) and 11, 1962 (5-7).

Personnel
Coleman Hawkins – tenor saxophone
Tommy Flanagan – piano
Major Holley – bass
Eddie Locke – drums

References

Impulse! Records albums
Coleman Hawkins albums
1963 albums
Albums produced by Bob Thiele
Albums recorded at Van Gelder Studio